Alena Konečná (born 27 May 1984) is a road cyclist from Czech Republic. She represented her nation at the 2007 UCI Road World Championships. In 2008, she participated at the 2008 World University Cycling Championship in the women's road race.

References

External links
 profile at Procyclingstats.com

1984 births
Czech female cyclists
Living people
Place of birth missing (living people)